Eupithecia harrisonata is a moth in the family Geometridae. It is found in North America, from British Columbia to California.

Adults have been recorded on wing from March to May and again from July to August.

References

Moths described in 1951
harrisonata
Moths of North America